Brecht's Mistress is a 2003 novel by the French writer Jacques-Pierre Amette. It is also known as Brecht's Lover. It received the Prix Goncourt.

Plot
In 1948, the German playwright Bertolt Brecht leaves New York to return to Berlin. There he meets a young woman, Maria, with whom he falls in love, but who turns out to be a spy in the service of the Stasi, the East German secret services.

See also
 2003 in literature
 Contemporary French literature

References

2003 French novels
French-language novels
Prix Goncourt winning works
Éditions Albin Michel books